The 1930 Brooklyn Dodgers season was their inaugural season in the league and the 11th season overall for the erratic Triangles-Colts franchise. The team finished fourth in the league at 7–4–1. They both shut out five opponents and were shut out by five opponents.

The Dodgers had purchased the franchise rights of the Dayton Triangles, but most of the team's roster came from the previous year's Orange Tornadoes team as it was unfeasible for most of the Triangles' players to uproot their families and move from Dayton to Brooklyn on short-notice during the Great Depression.

Schedule

Standings

References

Brooklyn Dodgers (NFL) seasons
Brooklyn Dodgers (NFL)
Brooklyn
1930s in Brooklyn
Flatbush, Brooklyn